María del Mar Prieto Ibáñez is a Spanish football player. Throughout her career she played for Oroquieta Villaverde, AD Torrejón, Levante UD and Atlético Madrid in Spain's Superliga and Takarazuka Bunny in Japan's L. League.

She was a member of the Spain women's national football team, and played the 1997 European Championship.

International career
Mar Prieto made her senior international debut on 25 May 1985 in a 0–2 qualifying match lost with Switzerland in Cuenca.

International goals

References

1969 births
Living people
Spanish women's footballers
Spain women's international footballers
Primera División (women) players
Atlético Madrid Femenino players
Levante UD Femenino players
Expatriate women's footballers in Japan
Spanish expatriate footballers
Spanish expatriate sportspeople in Japan
Footballers from the Community of Madrid
Nadeshiko League players
Bunnys Kyoto SC players
Women's association football forwards
AD Torrejón CF Femenino players